The Second Cabinet of Nikola Hristić was a cabinet of the Kingdom of Serbia from October 3, 1883 to February 19, 1884.

King Milan I was facing the Timok Rebellion, so he got Nikola Hristić out of retirement and installed him as the new Prime Minister and as the Minister of Internal Affairs. The Timok Rebellion was successfully crushed, and the leaders of it, most notably Nikola Pašić of the People's Radical Party, fled to Bulgaria. After the rebellion was crushed, new elections were held in early 1884, and a new cabinet was formed under Milutin Garašanin.

Cabinet members

See also
Nikola Hristić
Cabinet of Serbia

References

Serbia
Cabinets established in 1883
Cabinets disestablished in 1884